Time Stands Still or Time Stand Still may refer to:

Theatre, Film and TV
 Time Stands Still (play), a Donald Margulies play starring Laura Linney, Brian d'Arcy James, and Alicia Silverstone
Time Stands Still (Degrassi: The Next Generation), two season 4 episodes from Degrassi: The Next Generation
Time Stands Still (film), a 1982 Hungarian film

Music

Albums
 Time Stands Still, album by Emma Kirkby of songs composed by John Dowland and Thomas Campion 
 Time Stands Still (Chris Smither album), a 2009 album by singer-songwriter Chris Smither
 Time Stands Still, album by Rebecca Wheatley 
 Time Stands Still, album by Mike Howe 
 Time Stands Still, album by Taylor Locke
 Time Stands Still, album by Unleash the Archers 2015
 Time Stands Still (Family Force 5 album)
 Time Stand Still, the sixth studio album by American rock band The Hooters, released in 2007

Songs
 "Time Stands Still, an English lute song by John Dowland, from The Third and Last Booke of Songs or Aires (1603), no. 2
 "Time Stands Still", a song by Meredith MacRae 1964
 "Time Stands Still", a song by Gary Lewis & the Playboys 1965
 Time Stands Still (The All-American Rejects song), a 2003 song by the power pop band The All-American Rejects
 "Time Stands Still", a song by Chuck Jackson 1991
 "Time Stand Still" (song), a 1987 song by the progressive rock band Rush